The following article presents a summary of the 1952 football (soccer) season in Brazil, which was the 51st season of competitive football in the country.

Torneio Rio-São Paulo
Final Standings

Championship playoff

Portuguesa declared as the Torneio Rio-São Paulo champions.

State championship champions

Other competition champions

Brazilian clubs in international competitions

Brazil national team
The following table lists all the games played by the Brazil national football team in official competitions and friendly matches during 1952.

References

 Brazilian competitions at RSSSF
 1952 Brazil national team matches at RSSSF

 
Seasons in Brazilian football
Brazil